is an Echizen Railway Mikuni Awara Line railway station located in the city of Sakai, Fukui Prefecture, Japan.

Lines

Station layout
The station consists of one island platform connected to the station building by a level crossing. The station is unattended. A piece of public art doubles as a roofed walkway between the station and a nearby parking lot.

Adjacent stations

History
Ōzeki Station was opened on December 30, 1928. On September 1, 1942 the Keifuku Electric Railway merged with Mikuni Awara Electric Railway. Operations were halted from June 25, 2001. The station reopened on August 10, 2003 as an Echizen Railway station.

Passenger statistics
In fiscal 2015, the station was used by an average of 81 passengers daily (boarding passengers only).

Surrounding area
The station is surrounded by residences and fields. Fukui Prefectural Route 154 lies to the south.
Other points of interest include:
Fukui / Ishikawa Prefectural Route 5 (Awara Kaidō)
Ricoh Japan Fukui Plant
Ōzeki Post Office

See also
 List of railway stations in Japan

References

External links

  

Railway stations in Fukui Prefecture
Railway stations in Japan opened in 1928
Mikuni Awara Line
Sakai, Fukui